Aykut Demir (born 22 October 1988) is a professional footballer who plays as a centre back for Ankara Keçiörengücü. Born in the Netherlands, he represents Turkey at international level.

Club career
Demir made his debut in professional football in the 2005–06 season as part of the NAC Breda squad. He was loaned to Excelsior and later played for Turkish side Gençlerbirliği before joining Trabzonspor.

In 2017, he moved to TFF First League club Giresunspor. In 2019, he signed to BB Erzurumspor. After a one-year stint with Boluspor, he returned to BB Erzurumspor in July 2021.

Personal life 
Demir is Muslim. He is known for having controversial opinions about other religions.

Controversies 

On 31 December, Demir was married at age 28. Since his bride was not at the wedding, it was unknown who he married.

He was criticized for wearing a taqiya and having a Tawhid flag in his wedding hall.

In BB Erzurumspor's match with MKE Ankaragücü on 2021–22 TFF First League's 27. match week, All Erzurumspor players wore a "no to war" pre-match ceremony shirt in support of Ukraine, except Demir, who refused to wear the shirt. In response to the criticism, he told the media that he did not wear the shirt because he "wouldn't be comfortable wearing it while there were civilians dying in Palestine."

International career
Demir made his debut for Turkey in a November 2013 friendly match against Belarus.

References

External links
 
 
 
 
 

1988 births
Living people
Sportspeople from Bergen op Zoom
Dutch people of Turkish descent
Association football central defenders
Dutch footballers
Turkish footballers
Turkey international footballers
Turkey B international footballers
Turkey under-21 international footballers
Turkey youth international footballers
DOSKO players
NAC Breda players
Excelsior Rotterdam players
Gençlerbirliği S.K. footballers
Trabzonspor footballers
Ankaraspor footballers
Giresunspor footballers
Büyükşehir Belediye Erzurumspor footballers
Boluspor footballers
Ankara Keçiörengücü S.K. footballers
Eredivisie players
Eerste Divisie players
Süper Lig players
TFF First League players
Footballers from North Brabant